The Go-Go Boys: The Inside Story of Cannon Films is a 2014 documentary film, produced and directed by Hilla Medalia and written by Medalia and Daniel Sivan.

The film explores the effect of two Israeli cousins, Menahem Golan and Yoram Globus, on Hollywood by producing films and starting one of the most successful independent production companies, Cannon Films. Apart from Golan and Globus, other Hollywood personalities appearing in the film include Sylvester Stallone, Jon Voight, Charles Bronson, Chuck Norris, Michael Dudikoff, Billy Drago, Andrey Konchalovskiy and Franco Zeffirelli.

The film had its world premiere at 2014 Cannes Film Festival on May 16, 2014, in Cannes Classics section.

Synopsis
In the 1980s, two Israeli cousins (Menahem Golan and Yoram Globus) influenced Hollywood by producing over 300 films and starting one of the most successful independent production companies, Cannon Films. Their complex and differing personalities made them successful and eventually led to their downfall.

Reception
The film received mixed to positive reviews from the critics upon its premier at Cannes. Todd McCarthy of The Hollywood Reporter criticized the film, writing "It rather disingenuously ignores two major issues. First, Cannon had very bad taste in movies. Second, there’s precious little discussion, except in the most general terms, of the company’s suspected financial shenanigans." Ultimately concluded that "(it shows) A little love for Golan and Globus."

Tom Christie gave the film a negative review for Indiewire, writing "There's nothing particularly special about Hilla Medalia's documentary, The Go-Go Boys: The Inside Story of Cannon Films, other than its subjects, Menahem Golan and Yorum Globus."

However, Alissa Simon of Variety gave the film a positive review, calling it "both an affectionate tribute and a cautionary tale" and "a solid celebration of Menachem Golan, Yoram Globus and their famous filmmaking empire."

Craig Skinner wrote in his review for Film Divider that "The Go-Go Boys presents a fascinating portrait that goes beyond the films and tells an enthralling story of two men who grasped the American Dream in all four hands. They may not have always been working towards something that was really worth the effort, but whatever they did, they did it with passion."

See also
Electric Boogaloo: The Wild, Untold Story of Cannon Films, a 2014 Australian-American documentary film

References

External links
 
 

2014 films
English-language Israeli films
Hebrew-language films
2010s French-language films
2014 documentary films
Documentary films about the film industry
The Cannon Group, Inc.
2010s English-language films
Israeli documentary films
Israeli multilingual films
2014 multilingual films